Enoch is an unincorporated community in Lee County, Kentucky, United States.

References

Unincorporated communities in Lee County, Kentucky
Unincorporated communities in Kentucky